The Al-Shabab Mubarak al-Aiar Stadium is a multiuse stadium in Jahra, Kuwait. It is used mostly for football matches, on club level by Al Jahra of the Kuwaiti Premier League. The stadium has a capacity of 17,000 spectators.

References

Football venues in Kuwait